The 1978–79 UEFA Cup was won by Borussia Mönchengladbach on aggregate over Red Star Belgrade.

The third club was revoked to Switzerland and Poland, and it was assigned to Bulgaria and East Germany.

First round

|}

First leg

Enzo Ferrero scored an olympic goal.

Second leg

Dukla Prague won 2–1 on aggregate.

1–1 on aggregate. Milan won in a penalty shoot-out.

Valencia won 5–3 on aggregate.

Borussia Mönchengladbach won 7–2 on aggregate.

Argeș Pitești won 5–1 on aggregate.

Ajax won 3–2 on aggregate.

Everton won 10–0 on aggregate.

Lausanne-Sport won 2–0 on aggregate.

Benfica won 2–0 on aggregate.

Sporting Gijón won 3–1 on aggregate.

Braga won 7–3 on aggregate.

West Bromwich Albion won 6–2 on aggregate.

6–6 on aggregate, Red Star Belgrade won on away goals rule.

KuPS won 6–5 on aggregate.

Stuttgart won 7–3 on aggregate.

Torpedo Moscow won 7–3 on aggregate.

Strasbourg won 4–3 on aggregate.

MSV Duisburg won 10–2 on aggregate.

Standard Liège won 1–0 on aggregate.

Esbjerg won 1–0 on aggregate.

Arsenal won 7–1 on aggregate.

Carl Zeiss Jena won 3–2 on aggregate.

1–1 on aggregate, ÍBV won on away goals rule.

Manchester City won 4–3 on aggregate.

Hibernian won 3–2 on aggregate.

Politehnica Timișoara won 3–2 on aggregate.

Śląsk Wrocław won 7–3 on aggregate.

Levski Sofia won 4–3 on aggregate.

Dinamo Tbilisi won 3–1 on aggregate.

Hajduk Split won 3–2 on aggregate.

Hertha BSC won 2–1 on aggregate.

Budapest Honvéd won 8–2 on aggregate.

Second round

|}

First leg

Second leg

Ajax won 5–0 on aggregate.

Budapest Honvéd won 4–2 on aggregate.

2–2 on aggregate, Dukla Prague won on away goals rule.

Valencia won 6–4 on aggregate.

MSV Duisburg won 3–0 on aggregate.

Stuttgart won 3–2 on aggregate.

2–2 on aggregate, Arsenal won on away goals rule.

Hertha BSC won 2–1 on aggregate.

Śląsk Wrocław won 4–1 on aggregate.

Esbjerg won 6–1 on aggregate.

Manchester City won 4–2 on aggregate.

Milan won 4–1 on aggregate.
On 23 November 1978, UEFA fined Milan $14,000 for a bribery attempt to the Scottish referee John Gordon and linesmen Rollo Kyle and David McCartney (Italian club took the officials to shop for free the day before the game). Curiously, UEFA did not sanction the referee at all, however, Scottish Football Association suspended him.

Strasbourg won 2–1 on aggregate.

West Bromwich Albion won 3–0 on aggregate.

Borussia Mönchengladbach won 2–0 on aggregate.

Red Star Belgrade won 2–1 on aggregate.

Third round

|}

First leg

Second leg

Manchester City won 5–2 on aggregate.

Borussia Mönchengladbach won 5–3 on aggregate.

Budapest Honvéd won 4–3 on aggregate.

Hertha BSC won 5–2 on aggregate.

MSV Duisburg won 4–0 on aggregate.

Red Star Belgrade won 2–1 on aggregate.

West Bromwich Albion won 3–1 on aggregate.

Dukla Prague won 5–4 on aggregate.

Quarter-finals

|}

First leg

Second leg

4–4 on aggregate, MSV Duisburg won on away goals rule.

Hertha BSC won 3–2 on aggregate.

Borussia Mönchengladbach won 4–2 on aggregate.

Red Star Belgrade won 2–1 on aggregate.

Semi-finals

|}

First leg

Second leg

Borussia Mönchengladbach won 6–3 on aggregate.

2–2 on aggregate, Red Star Belgrade won on away goals rule.

Final

First leg

Second leg

Borussia Mönchengladbach won 2–1 on aggregate.

References

External links
1978–79 All matches UEFA Cup – season at UEFA website
Official Site
Results at RSSSF.com
 All scorers 1978–79 UEFA Cup according to protocols UEFA
1978/79 UEFA Cup - results and line-ups (archive)

UEFA Cup seasons
2